Frequency assignment is the authorization of use of a particular radio frequency.

In Article 1.18 of the International Telecommunication Union's (ITU) Radio Regulations (RR), the process is defined as "Authorization given by a frequency administration for a radio station to use a radio frequency or radio frequency channel under specified conditions".

Daily impact
Every day, users rely on assignment of frequencies for efficient use of such devices as: 
 cell phone
 cordless phone
 garage door opener
 car key remote control
 broadcast television and audio
 Standard time broadcast
 vehicle-speed radar, air traffic radar, weather radar
 mobile radio
 Global Positioning System (GPS) navigation
 satellite TV broadcast reception; also backend signal dissemination
 Microwave oven
 Bluetooth
 Wi-Fi
 Zigbee
 RFID devices such as active badges, passports, wireless gasoline token, no-contact credit-cards, and product tags
 toll-road payment vehicle transponders
 Citizen's band radio and Family Radio Service
 Radio control, including Radio-controlled model aircraft and vehicles
 wireless microphones and musical instrument links

Frequency assignment is also a special term, used by national frequency administrations. For other terms see table below.

See also
Radio station
Frequency administration
Spectrum management
Frequency coordinator
Broadcast license
Cellular frequencies
Earth observation satellites transmission frequencies

References / sources 

 International Telecommunication Union (ITU)

International Telecommunication Union